Sidi Bou Othmane is a town in Rehamna Province, Marrakesh-Safi, Morocco. According to the 2004 census it has a population of 5,066.

The famous Battle of Sidi Bou Othman was fought here on 6 September 1912, between the French colonial forces and the army of Ahmed al-Hiba.

References

Populated places in Rehamna Province